Sugar Rush is an American baking reality  streaming television series, released on Netflix on July 13, 2018. The series features four professional teams of two competing in a baking competition for a prize of $10,000. Teams of two bakers compete in three rounds. The first round is cupcakes, round two is confections, and round 3 is cake. The third season, dubbed Sugar Rush: Extra Sweet, is the series' first spin-off season, where if a team wins either a cupcake or confection challenge, they can choose either additional 15-minute time in the final cake challenge or $1,500 prize.

Cast
Sugar Rush is hosted by Hunter March and judged by professional chefs Candace Nelson and Adriano Zumbo, along with a different guest judge each episode.

Production
Sugar Rush is managed by Magical Elves production company. The company is also known for producing shows like Top Chef and Nailed It!. This Netflix original series is filmed in Hollywood, Los Angeles, California. The set is located at the Sunset Bronson Studio where it is filmed.

Episodes

Season 1 (2018)

Season 2 (2019)

Season 3: Extra Sweet (2020)

Christmas: Season 1 (2019)

Christmas: Season 2 (2020)

Notes

References

External links
 
 

2010s American reality television series
2020s American reality television series
2018 American television series debuts
2020 American television series endings
English-language Netflix original programming
Food reality television series
2010s American cooking television series
2020s American cooking television series
Reality competition television series